Kim Seung-Hyun (born 18 August 1979) is a South Korea retired football player, having previously played for Gwangju Sangmu, Busan I'Park, and the Chunnam Dragons.

He was arrested on the charge connected with the match fixing allegations on 7 July 2011. But He was found not guilty in the supreme court.

Club career 

Kim spent the initial stages of his professional career at the Chunnam Dragons, before having to transfer to Gwangju Sangmu while fulfilling his military obligations.  Completing his stint at Gwangju in 2005, Kim returned to the Dragons for two more seasons.  For the 2008 K-League season, Kim moved to Busan for the year and then returned to the Dragons for a further two seasons.  For 2011, Kim has transferred to Daegu FC.

International career 
Kim has made a single appearance for the U-23s, during the qualification stages for the 2000 Olympic games in Australia.

References

External links 

1979 births
Living people
South Korean footballers
Jeonnam Dragons players
Gimcheon Sangmu FC players
Busan IPark players
Daegu FC players
K League 1 players

Association football midfielders